Gandi Mukli (born 1968, Munich, West Germany) is a German actor.

Life 
The son of a Turk and a Syrian, Mukli grew up in Munich and lives in Cologne. His early roles were in small films such as, among other things, Ein Stückchen Himmel and Kir Royal.

After his debut cinematic appearance in the  film Winterblume (1997), he played the leading role in the Kutluğ Ataman film Lola und Bilidikid in 1998. Films and TV roles were followed. Between 1998 and 2004, he had several roles in the ARD TV series Lindenstraße.

The Migration Audio Archive contains an autobiographical text of Mukli.

External links 
 

1968 births
Living people
German male film actors
German male television actors
Male actors from Munich
German people of Turkish descent
German people of Syrian descent
Date of birth missing (living people)
20th-century German male actors
21st-century German male actors